Mark Cleaver (born 2 October 1967) is a New Zealand professional darts player who plays in Professional Darts Corporation (PDC) events.

Career 
Cleaver made his World Series of Darts debut in the 2015 Auckland Darts Masters losing to Peter Wright from Scotland. He then participated at 2017 Auckland Darts Masters, losing to James Wade of England, and then played at the 2018 Brisbane Darts Masters losing to Michael van Gerwen from Netherlands.

References

External links 

1967 births
Living people
New Zealand darts players
Professional Darts Corporation associate players
People from Taranaki